This article describes severe weather terminology used by the National Weather Service (NWS) in the United States. The NWS, a government agency operating as an arm of the National Oceanic and Atmospheric Administration (NOAA) branch of the United States Department of Commerce (DoC), defines precise meanings for nearly all of its weather terms.

This article describes NWS terminology and related weather scales used by the agency. Some terms may be specific to certain cities or regions. Specific Area Message Encoding (SAME) product codes assigned to each term for NOAA Weather Radio (NWR) broadcasts are included in parentheses following the title of the described alert type if used; products that do not have a specified code are identified where applicable as Non-Precipitation Warnings/Watches/Advisories (NPW), Coastal Flood Warnings/Watches/Advisories (CFW), Marine Weather Statement (MWS), Surf Discussion (SRD) or Winter Weather Warnings/Watches/Advisories (WSW) as defined by NOAA.

Definitions of severe weather alerts
The NWS divides severe weather alerts into several types of hazardous/hydrologic events:
 Severe local storms – Short-fused, small-scale hazardous weather or hydrologic events produced by thunderstorms (including large hail, damaging winds, tornadoes, and flash floods).
 Winter storms – Weather hazards associated with freezing or frozen precipitation (freezing rain, sleet, and/or snow), or combined effects of winter precipitation and strong winds.
 Fire weather – Weather conditions that contribute to an increased risk and help cause the spread of wildfires.
 Flooding – Hazardous hydrological events resulting in temporary inundation of land areas not normally covered by water, often caused by excessive rainfall.
 Coastal/lakeshore hazards – Hydrological hazards that may affect property, marine or leisure activities in areas near ocean and lake waters including high surf and coastal or lakeshore flooding, as well as rip currents.
 Marine hazards – Hazardous events that may affect marine travel, fishing and shipping interests along large bodies of water, including hazardous seas and freezing spray.
 Tropical cyclone hazards – Hazardous tropical cyclone events that may affect property in inland areas or marine activities in coastal waters, resulting in wind damage, storm surge, tornadoes and flooding rain.
 Non-precipitation hazards – Weather hazards not directly associated with any of the above including extreme heat or cold, dense fog, high winds, and river or lakeshore flooding.

Severe local storms

Tornado watch (TOA; yellow box in some select NWS documentation, red box in most other media) – Conditions are favorable for the development of severe thunderstorms and tornadoes in and close to the watch area. These watches are issued for large areas by the Storm Prediction Center in Norman, Oklahoma, and are usually valid for five to eight hours.
Particularly dangerous situation tornado watch (TOA) – Conditions are favorable for the development of severe thunderstorms capable of producing destructive tornadoes in and close to the watch area. These watches are occasionally issued, and usually mean that a major tornado outbreak is possible, where the potential for multiple violent (EF-4 and EF-5) tornadoes exists. Usually only reserved for forecast "high-end" severe weather events, this type of watch is usually valid for a longer period of time and issued for a larger area by the Storm Prediction Center in Norman, Oklahoma, than a typical tornado watch.
Tornado warning (TOR) – Strong rotation in a thunderstorm has been indicated by Doppler weather radar or a tornado has been sighted by Skywarn spotters or other persons (such as local law enforcement). These warnings are currently issued on a polygonal basis, are usually issued for a duration of 30 minutes (but can run for as long as one hour), and can be issued without either a tornado watch or a severe thunderstorm watch being already in effect. Tornado warnings may be issued in combination with a Special Marine Warning if the storm affects nearshore or coastal waters.
Particularly dangerous situation tornado warning (TOR) – A large tornado has been confirmed to be producing damage and is moving into and through the warned area. It is usually issued as the initial tornado warning or as a complete re-issuance of the previous tornado warning. These may also include wording for a tornado emergency.
Tornado emergency (SVS) – Sent as a "severe weather statement" or a complete re-issuance of the tornado warning, this is an unofficial, high-end tornado warning issued when a violent tornado is expected to impact a heavily populated area. Such warnings have been issued for, among other significant tornado events, the F5-rated tornado that destroyed much of Bridge Creek, Moore and portions of southeastern Oklahoma City, Oklahoma on May 3, 1999 (during which the product was conceived by the NWS Forecast Office in Norman); the EF5 tornado that destroyed much of Greensburg, Kansas on May 4, 2007; the EF4 tornado that hit Tuscaloosa, Alabama on April 27, 2011; the EF5 tornado that affected Moore and adjacent southern portions of the Oklahoma City area on May 20, 2013; the May 31, 2013 tornado system that went over the Oklahoma City area through an extremely densely populated area of  El Reno in Canadian County; the EF4 tornado that hit Beauregard, Alabama on March 3, 2019, the EF4 tornado that affected western portions of the Kansas City area on May 28, 2019 and the EF4 tornado that affected several areas in Mississippi on April 12, 2020. This enhanced form of a tornado warning is issued mainly by Weather Forecast Offices within the National Weather Service's Central and Southern Region Headquarters; a tornado emergency is the highest level of a three-tiered Impact Based Warning system for tornadoes used by all WFOs within the Central Region Headquarters, and eight others within the Eastern, Southern and Western Regions.
Severe thunderstorm watch (SVA; pink box or blue box in NWS documents, typically yellow box in other media) – Conditions are favorable for the development of severe thunderstorms in and close to the watch area. A severe thunderstorm contains large damaging hail of  diameter or larger, and/or damaging winds greater than 58 mph (95 km/h or 50 knots) or greater. Isolated tornadoes are also possible (depending on whether atmospheric conditions are sufficient to produce tornadic activity) but not expected to be the dominant severe weather event. These watches are issued for large areas by the Storm Prediction Center in Norman, Oklahoma, and are usually valid for five to eight hours.
Particularly dangerous situation severe thunderstorm watch (SVA) – Conditions are favorable for the development of severe thunderstorms in and close to the watch area. Isolated tornadoes are possible but not expected to be the dominant severe weather event, hence these watches are very rarely issued. An expected severe wind event (derecho) is the mostly likely reason for a PDS severe thunderstorm watch to be issued, with widespread winds greater than 90 mph (150 km/h or 80 knots) possible. These watches are usually valid for a longer period of time and are issued for a larger area by the Storm Prediction Center in Norman, Oklahoma than a typical severe thunderstorm watch. This type of watch is usually only reserved for forecast "high-end" severe weather events. If, however, tornadoes are expected to be a major weather threat in addition to the preceding criteria, then a standard tornado watch (generally not a PDS watch) would be issued instead.
Severe thunderstorm warning (SVR) – A severe thunderstorm is indicated by Doppler weather radar or sighted by Skywarn spotters or other persons, such as local law enforcement. These warnings are currently issued on a polygonal basis, are usually issued for a duration of 30 minutes to one hour, and can be issued without a severe thunderstorm watch or a tornado watch being already in effect. Because severe thunderstorms can produce tornadoes with little or no advance warning, a severe thunderstorm warning may be upgraded to a tornado warning if strong rotation is indicated or a tornado is sighted. Lightning frequency is not a criterion for issuing a severe thunderstorm warning. Severe thunderstorm warnings may be issued in combination with a special marine warning if the storm affects nearshore or coastal waters.
Particularly dangerous situation severe thunderstorm warning (SVR) – Issued within the initial severe thunderstorm warning or as a complete re-issuance of the previously issued warning, a PDS severe thunderstorm warning indicates a significant severe thunderstorm has been detected by Doppler weather radar and/or observed by Skywarn spotters or other civil defense personnel, and is moving into and through the warned area with the capability of causing significant property damage, and severe injury or fatality to people or animals caught in the storm's path. These may be issued for an ongoing severe wind event (either by a derecho, or from an intense wind core or downburst within a squall line or supercell) containing winds greater than 80 mph (124 km/h or 70 knots), and/or extreme hail of  diameter or larger over a wide area. Specific to this product, the boilerplate PDS wording ("this is a particularly dangerous situation") placed between the storm summary and hazard information in the warning text was replaced in July 2021 with the notation "this is a destructive storm for[...]," highlighting specific locations under greatest threat from extreme winds or hail accompanying the warned storm.
Severe thunderstorm emergency (SVS) – Sent as a "severe weather statement" or a complete re-issuance of the severe thunderstorm warning, this is an unofficial, high-end severe thunderstorm warning that is occasionally issued when a significant severe thunderstorm is imminent or impacting a highly populated area. First issued by the National Weather Service office in Cheyenne, Wyoming on August 16, 2019, the National Weather Service does not currently maintain a concrete criterion for issuance, although Weather Forecast Offices that issue or have issued such warnings may use the same criteria meriting a PDS Severe Thunderstorm Warning to indicate life-threatening severe weather conditions that will impact a densely populated area.
 Severe weather statement (SVS) – A statement issued to provide updated information for active severe thunderstorm and tornado warnings to the public and emergency managers, with revised information including reports of observed severe weather and the approximate location of the storm cell (as indicated by the most recently updated NEXRAD data) at the time of the statement's issuance. Severe Weather Statements may include notices of cancellation (if the warning is being discontinued entirely, or if sections of counties or county-equivalent jurisdictions are being removed from the continuing warning), or notices of a warning being allowed to expire because the prompting storm has weakened below severe criteria.
Flash flood watch (FFA; green box) – Conditions are favorable for flash flooding or urban flooding in and close to the watch area within the next 36 hours. These watches are issued by the Weather Forecast Office and are usually issued six to 24 hours in advance of expected flood potential. (The Heavy Rainfall Warning product issued by the Meteorological Service of Canada has a similar meaning as an NWS Flash Flood Watch.)
Particularly dangerous situation flash flood watch (FFA) – Conditions are favorable for an extremely elevated level of severe and life-threatening flash flooding beyond the level of a normal flash flood watch in and close to the watch area. These watches are usually issued for a smaller area by the local WFOs than typical flash flood watches, which often span multiple county warning areas, and are usually valid for a longer period of time. This type of watch is usually only reserved for forecast "high-end" flash flood events.
Flash flood warning (FFW) – Flash flooding—either indicated by Doppler weather radar or stream gauges, or reported by Skywarn spotters or local emergency officials—is occurring, imminent, or highly likely in the short term. A flash flood is a flood that occurs within six hours of excessive rainfall and poses a threat to life and/or property, especially in low-lying or flood prone areas (including urban areas with poor drainage, rivers and streams); ice jams and dam failures can also cause flash floods. These warnings are issued on a county by county (or equivalent thereof) basis by the local Weather Forecast Office and are generally in effect for two to six hours, although particularly during tropical cyclones a warning may last for a longer period of time, and occasionally last shorter than two hours.
Particularly dangerous situation flash flood warning (FFW) – Issued within the initial flash flood warning or as a complete re-issuance of the previously issued warning, this indicates widespread, life-threatening flash flooding—caused by excessive rainfall, ice jams or imminent dam failures—has been indicated by Doppler weather radar, emergency personnel or trained observers over a broadly populated area.
Flash flood emergency (FFS) – A flash flood emergency is a high-end usage of the flash flood warning. The flash flood emergency term is used when widespread flooding is occurring, and either, multiple water rescues have been reported in the past few hours, or if highly populated regions are undergoing significant flash flooding likely to cause loss of life and property. This terminology is more widely used during hurricanes with high amounts of moisture (an example is Hurricane Harvey in 2017, during which multiple flash flood emergencies were issued for portions of southeast Texas and southern Louisiana, including the Houston area).
 Flash flood statement (FFS) – A hydrological weather statement issued to provide updated information on active flash flood watches and warnings to the public and emergency managers.

Deprecated
These advisories are issued as special weather statements written in the style of severe thunderstorm and other short-fused warnings, usually on a county by county (or equivalent thereof) basis. Some areas use an entirely different format (most notably WFOs in the Northeast and Mid-Atlantic), denoting which locations in each county will be affected by the thunderstorm. The NWS ceased use of the "significant weather advisory" titling in July 2021; special weather statements for non-severe thunderstorms concurrently adopted product language following the Impact Based Warning format used for severe convective storms.

Winter precipitation
There are no temperature criteria in the definition of a blizzard, but freezing temperatures of at least  and  winds will create wind chills of at least . A winter storm watch for blizzard conditions is issued when conditions meeting criteria are forecast to occur within 12 to 48 hours.
Winter storm warning (WSW) – Hazardous winter weather conditions that pose a threat to life and/or property are occurring, imminent, or highly likely within 12 to 48 hours. The generic term, Winter Storm Warning, is used for a combination of two or more of the following winter weather events: heavy snow, freezing rain, sleet, and strong winds. The forecast accumulation criteria for each frozen precipitation type vary significantly over different county warning areas. The National Weather Service has deprecated the Heavy Snow Warning and Sleet Warning products in favor of issuing a Winter Storm Warning for Heavy Snow or a Winter Storm Warning for Heavy Sleet, respectively.
Ice storm warning (WSW) – Heavy ice accumulations that may cause significant disruptions to travel and public utilities, and damage to trees and utility infrastructure impacting life and property are imminent. (Hazardous icing conditions are covered and similar warning criteria are used by the Meteorological Service of Canada for their Freezing Rain Warning product.)
Winter storm watch (WSA) – Hazardous winter weather conditions including significant accumulations of snow and/or freezing rain and/or sleet are possible generally within 24 to 48 hours. The generic term, Winter Storm Watch, is used for a combination of two or more of the following winter weather events: heavy snow, freezing rain, sleet, and strong winds. The forecast accumulation criteria for each frozen precipitation type vary significantly over different county warning areas. These watches are issued by local National Weather Service Forecast Offices.
Winter weather advisory (WSW) – Hazardous winter weather conditions are occurring, imminent, or likely. Conditions will cause a significant inconvenience and if caution is not exercised, may result in a potential threat to life and/or property. The generic term, Winter Weather Advisory (which replaced the previously used "Travelers Advisory"), is used for a combination of two or more of the following events; snow, freezing rain or freezing drizzle, sleet, and blowing snow. The forecast accumulation criteria—defined below locally designated warning criteria or based on NWS impact-driven advisory criteria—for at least one of the frozen precipitation elements within a defined 12 or 24 hour period vary significantly over different county warning areas. The National Weather Service has deprecated the snow advisory and blowing snow advisory in favor of issuing a winter weather advisory for snow or a winter weather advisory for snow and blowing snow, respectively.
Lake-effect snow squalls can significantly reduce visibilities with little notice. Although discontinued on October 15, 2018 and replaced with a winter storm warning for heavy lake-effect snow, it was reinstated beginning with the 2019-2020 winter storm season.
Snow squall warning (SQW) – An intense, generally limited duration, period of moderate to heavy snowfall has been observed by radar. Snow accumulation may be significant.

Deprecated
Heavy snow warning (WSW) – Heavy snowfall amounts are imminent; the criteria for amounts (based on 12-hour and 24-hour minimum accumulations) vary significantly over different county warning areas. Discontinued beginning with the 2008-2009 winter storm season and replaced with the winter storm warning for heavy snow.
Discontinued beginning with the 2008-2009 winter storm season and replaced by the winter storm warning for heavy sleet.
Because sleet usually occurs with other precipitation types, a Winter Weather Advisory will almost always be used in such cases. Discontinued beginning with the 2008-2009 winter storm season and replaced with the winter weather advisory for sleet.
Snow advisory (WSW) – Moderate snowfall amounts are imminent; the criteria for amounts vary significantly over different county warning areas. Under the former definition, a snow advisory could be warranted if lesser snowfall accumulations were forecast to produce travel difficulties, especially early in the winter season. Discontinued beginning with the 2008-2009 winter storm season and replaced by the winter weather advisory for snow.
Discontinued beginning with the 2008-2009 winter storm season and replaced by the Winter Weather Advisory for Blowing Snow.
Discontinued beginning with the 2008-2009 winter storm season and replaced by the winter weather advisory for snow and blowing snow.
Extreme cold watch (WSW) – Dangerously low temperatures are possible for a prolonged period of time. Frostbite and hypothermia are likely if exposed to these temperatures.
Extreme cold warning (WSW) – Dangerously low temperatures are expected for a prolonged period of time. Frostbite and hypothermia are likely if exposed to these temperatures. Initially used as an experiment in 2011 and discontinued beginning with the 2011-2012 winter storm season, it was reinstated in 2018 as a merger of the extreme cold warning and wind chill warning.
Lake effect snow watch (WSW) – Significant amounts of lake-effect snow (generally  within 12 hours or  within 24 hours) are possible in the next 12 to 48 hours. Discontinued on October 2, 2017; a winter storm watch is now issued instead.
Lake effect snow advisory (WSW) – Moderate amounts of lake-effect snow (generally ) are expected or occurring. Discontinued on October 2, 2017; a winter weather advisory for lake-effect snow is now issued instead.
Freezing rain advisory  (WSW; alt.: freezing drizzle advisory) – Freezing rain or freezing drizzle producing ice accretion of up to  that may cause significant travel impairments is expected or occurring. Discontinued on October 2, 2017; a winter weather advisory for freezing rain is now issued instead.
The NWS deprecated issuance of blizzard watches in October 2017; a winter storm watch is now issued in its place.

Fire weather
Fire warning (FRW) – A major, uncontrolled wildfire or structural fire is currently burning in a populated area and/or near major roadways, and evacuation is recommended by local civil authorities.
Red flag warning (FWA) – Extreme burning conditions favor the combustion and rapid spread of wildfires within 12 to 24 hours in areas that have not received precipitation for a short period or are experiencing drought conditions, and which the National Fire Danger Rating System (NFDRS) designates as having a high to extreme fire danger. It is issued primarily to alert fire department officials and firefighters of conditions ideal for the combustion and spread of wildfires. The surface relative humidity (RH) and 10-hour fuel moisture criteria meriting a Fire Weather Watch may vary by state based on local vegetation, topography and distance from major water sources, though forecast sustained winds are usually expected to be  or greater.
Extreme red flag warning (FWA) – Conditions for wildland fire combustion, rapid growth and behavior are extremely dangerous, due to very dry fuels, very low humidity levels, and strong winds. Introduced in October 2019, it is analogous to particularly dangerous situation wording for severe weather watches and warnings and superseded such wording occasionally applied to red flag warnings previously.
Fire weather watch (FWA) – Conditions expected to become favorable for the rapid spread of wildfires in areas of dry vegetation within 12 to 48 hours or up to 72 hours if the NWS office is reasonably confident that red flag fire conditions will occur. It is issued primarily to alert fire and land management agencies of conditions ideal for the combustion and spread of wildfires. The surface relative humidity and 10-hour fuel moisture criteria meriting a fire weather watch may vary depending by state based on local vegetation, topography and distance from major water sources, though forecast sustained winds are usually expected to be  or greater.

Flooding
Areal flood warning (FLW) – General or areal flooding of streets, low-lying areas, urban storm drains, creeks, and small streams in which there is a serious threat to life or property is occurring, imminent, or highly likely. Flood warnings are usually issued for flooding that occurs more than six hours after the excessive rainfall, or when flooding is imminent/occurring but is not rapid enough to prompt a flash flood warning. These warnings are issued on a polygonal basis by the local Weather Forecast Office and are generally in effect for six to twelve hours.
Areal flood watch (FLA) – Hydrometeorological conditions favor a threat of areal flooding affecting area streets, rivers, streams, and/or urban storm drains within six to 24 hours. It is intended to inform the public and cooperating agencies (including ambulance services and fire departments that may assist in water rescues) in advance of expected flood potential, even though the occurrence of flooding is neither certain nor imminent.
Areal flood advisory (FLS) – Minor general or areal flooding of streets, low-lying areas, urban storm drains, creeks, and small streams is occurring, imminent, or highly likely within the next one to three hours, but is not expected to substantially threaten life and property. These advisories are issued on a polygonal basis by the local Weather Forecast Office and are generally in effect for three to six hours.
River flood warning (FLS; formerly flood warning for river forecast point) – Flooding of streams or rivers is occurring, imminent, or highly likely. These warnings are issued either by the River Forecast Centers for the area surrounding affected streams or rivers or on a county by county basis by the local Weather Forecast Office and are generally in effect for an indeterminate period until river gauges in the affected areas record water levels receding below the water body's predetermined flood stage.
River flood advisory (FLS) – Minor flooding of streams or rivers reaching action stage is occurring, imminent, or highly likely. These advisories are issued on a county by county basis by the local Weather Forecast Office and are generally in effect for a couple of days or longer.
Urban and small stream flood advisory – Ponding of water on streets, low-lying areas, highways, underpasses, urban storm drains, and elevation of creek and small stream levels is occurring or imminent. Urban and small stream flood advisories are issued for flooding that occurs within three hours after the excessive rainfall. These advisories are issued on a polygonal basis by the local Weather Forecast Office and are generally in effect for three to four hours. (The watch/warning/advisory display map on the NWS's national and local Forecast Office websites does not display the advisory as an area-specific polygon, instead indicating the affected counties and/or county-equivalent subdivisions.)
 Flood statement (FLS) – A hydrological weather statement issued to provide updated information on ongoing flooding along major streams in which there is not a serious threat to life and/or property active or flood warnings to the public and emergency managers; information will be provided on observed (or if a dam is at risk of breaking, updates on the ongoing threat) flooding within the warning area, and current and forecast flood stages for lakes and rivers at the time of the statement's issuance.

Coastal/lakeshore hazards
Coastal flood warning (CFW) – Coastal flooding from ocean water being forced inland from the nearby body (caused by either nor'easters, tropical cyclones or thunderstorms) is occurring, imminent or highly likely within 12 to 24 hours, and poses a serious threat to life and/or property. WFOs may occasionally issue warnings valid after the second forecast period of the date of validity if a strong likelihood of the event exists or when a longer advance notice is needed for public response. 
Coastal flood watch (CFA) – Coastal flooding from ocean water being forced inland from the nearby body is possible within 12 to 48 hours, creating significant impacts to life and/or property.
Coastal flood advisory (CFW) – Minor coastal flooding or tidal overflow is occurring or is imminent within 12 hours. Flooding will not pose a serious threat to lives or property, but will create a nuisance for pedestrian and vehicle travel in the affected area.
Storm surge warning (SSW) – Localized heavy flooding associated with a tropical cyclone from storm surge waves moving inland from the shoreline is occurring or is imminent in the specified area within the next 36 hours, posing a significant threat to life and/or property. Similar criteria included in a Storm Surge Watch for conditions that would limit lead time for undertaking safety precautions and inclusion of areas that may experience isolation from surge inundation also apply to this product. Issued in collaboration between the NHC and local WFOs, Storm Surge Warnings are only issued for regions in the Atlantic and Gulf Coasts of the conterminous United States.
Storm surge watch (SSA) – Life-threatening inundation from rising water being forced inland by an ongoing or potential tropical, subtropical or post-tropical cyclone is possible within the specified area, generally within 48 hours. A watch may be issued in advance of the cyclone's landfall if other hazardous tropical conditions (such as the onset of tropical storm-force winds) are expected to limit enactment of evacuations and other safety precautions, and may also be issued for adjacent locations that could potentially be isolated by surge inundation. Issued in collaboration between the National Hurricane Center (NHC) and local Weather Forecast Offices, storm surge watches are only issued for regions in the Atlantic and Gulf Coasts of the conterminous United States.
Lakeshore flood warning (CFW) – Lakeshore flooding that poses a serious threat to life and/or property is occurring or is imminent in the next 12 to 24 hours.
Seiche warning (CFW) – Rapid, large fluctuations in water level in the Great Lakes (similar to the sloshing in a bath tub) caused by storms or high winds, resulting in both lakeshore flooding and critically low water levels at different times. Issued as a lakeshore flood warning with reference of being a seiche warning.
Lakeshore flood watch (CFW) – Lakeshore flooding that could pose a serious threat to life and/or property is possible within the next 12 to 48 hours.
Lakeshore flood advisory (CFW) – Minor lakeshore flooding that may pose a threat to life and/or property is occurring or is imminent in the next 12 hours.
The usage of this product is locally determined by each Weather Forecast Office.
High surf warning (SRD) – Destructive, pounding surf poses an especially heightened danger to life, boating and other marine property in and near the surf zone, and may damage property near the shoreline; high surf criteria may vary depending on the region. 
High surf advisory (SRD) – Pounding surf poses a danger to life, boating and other marine property within the surf zone; high surf criteria may vary depending on the region.
High surf watch (SRD) – A high surf event due to significant breaking wave action is possible in the next few days.
Rip current statement (SRD) – Describes a risk of rip currents present in the specified area; may be issued as a Beach Hazards Statement.
Beach hazards statement (SRD) – Issued for rip or longshore currents, or other hazards (including chemical or biological hazards) may create life-threatening conditions in lake or ocean waters. Beachgoers will be advised to exercise caution when in or near the water.

Marine hazards
Heavy freezing spray watch (MWS) – Usually issued for shipping interests when conditions are favorable for a heavy freezing spray event meeting Heavy Freezing Spray Warning criteria but its occurrence, location, and/or timing is still uncertain.
Freezing spray advisory (MWS) – Usually issued for shipping interests when conditions are probability of accumulating frozen sea spray on vessels of less than 2 cm per hour caused by some combination of cold water, wind, air temperature, and vessel movement.
Hazardous seas warning (MWS) – Significant wave heights and/or wave steepness values—independent of strong winds—are forecast to cause rough surf in the warned coastal area and adjacent waters, which could pose a serious threat to vessels that do not move to stable waters or dock. Warning criteria may vary depending on the NWS Weather Forecast Office.
Hazardous seas watch (MWS) – A rough surf event—regardless of forecast wind speeds that may contribute to such an occurrence—is possible in the warned coastal area and adjacent waters, but its occurrence, location, and/or timing remains uncertain. Warning criteria may vary depending on the NWS Weather Forecast Office.
Low water advisory (MWS) – Critically below average water levels over the Great Lakes, coastal marine zones or other tidal marine area, waterway, or river inlet within or adjacent to a marine zone have been observed, and potentially present a hazard to maritime navigation.
Marine weather statement (MWS) – The equivalent of a special weather statement at sea, indicating potentially hazardous marine conditions.
Short-duration mesoscale events (such as a strong cold front, gravity wave or squall line) expected to last two hours or less and produce criteria wind speeds, or volcanic ashfall may also warrant issuance.
Particularly dangerous situation special marine warning (SMW) – A warning to mariners of hazardous weather conditions that present a considerable threat to life and property.
Small craft advisory (SCA) – A warning to mariners of high sustained winds or frequent gusts and/or significant sea or wave heights that may damage or capsize small boats. Only issued by WFOs in coastal regions and the Great Lakes for areas included in the Coastal Waters Forecast or Nearshore Marine Forecast products. Thresholds necessitating the issuance of small craft advisories are determined by the accordant NWS Regional Headquarters.
Small craft advisory for hazardous seas (SCAH) – An advisory to mariners of wave or sea conditions that are potentially hazardous to small boats because of wave height, wave period, steepness, or swell direction, even if wind speeds are expected to fall below locally defined small craft advisory criteria. Only issued by WFOs in coastal regions and the Great Lakes for areas included in the Coastal Waters Forecast or Nearshore Marine Forecast products. Thresholds necessitating the issuance of this type of small craft advisory vary among geographic areas within each NWS Regional Headquarters.
Small craft advisory for rough bar (SCARB) – Waves in or near harbor or river entrances are expected to be especially hazardous to mariners due to the interaction of swell, tidal and/or river currents in relatively shallow water. Thresholds governing the issuance of this type of small craft advisory vary among local geographic areas, and are based upon locally determined parameters such as wave steepness, wind speed and direction, and local bathymetry.
Small craft advisory for winds (SCAW) – Wind speeds may pose potential hazards for maritime activity. Wave heights must remain below standard small craft advisory criteria to merit the issuance of a wind-based advisory. Thresholds necessitating the issuance of wind-based small craft advisories are determined by the accordant NWS Regional Headquarters.
Brisk wind advisory (NPW) – Sea or lake ice is expected and may be hazardous to small marine craft. May be issued as a Small Craft Advisory with reference of being a brisk wind advisory. This advisory is not issued by WFOs serving the Great Lakes region due to the prevalence of ice floes during winter in the lake bodies.

Temperature
See also Windchill section below.
Excessive heat warning (NPW) – Maximum Heat Index (HI) values are forecast to meet or exceed locally defined warning criteria for more than three hours over at least two consecutive days. Excessive Heat Warning are issued within 12 hours of the onset of the following Heat Index (HI) values criteria. Specific criteria vary among local Weather Forecast Offices, due to climate variability and the effect of excessive heat on the local population. Typical HI values are maximum daytime temperatures above  for up to three hours per day, with minimum nighttime temperatures above  (criteria may vary slightly by county warning area) for two consecutive days. Warning criteria may be lowered by the issuing WFO if the heat event occurs early in the season, during a multi-day heat wave or during a widespread power outage occurs during a heat event due to severe weather phenomena (such as high winds, severe thunderstorms, or a derecho).
Only issued by Weather Forecast Offices in Alaska. Elsewhere, an Extreme Cold Warning can be issued by local Weather Forecast Offices as an experimental product using locally appropriate thresholds, usually with little or no wind. (The product was first used experimentally by Weather Forecast Offices in North Dakota, South Dakota and Minnesota from January until April 2011.) The Extreme Cold Warning and the Wind Chill Warning products will be consolidated into a singular Extreme Cold Warning product for use by WFOs in the rest of the conterminious United States in 2021, accounting for NWS software upgrades.
Extreme cold watch (NPW) – Conditions are favorable for an extreme cold event to meet or exceed local Extreme Cold Warning criteria. Only issued by Weather Forecast Offices in Alaska.
Freeze warning (NPW/FZW) – Minimum shelter temperatures are forecast to be  or below over a widespread area within 12 to 36 hours, regardless of whether frost concurrently develops on plants, vegetation and other exposed surfaces. Freeze Warnings are usually issued to highlight freezes occurring during the locally defined starting and ending periods of the growing season (as determined by the average dates of the first freeze of Autumn and the last freeze of Spring), and will be intermediately issued when appropriate until the end of the growing season based on criteria set by the Weather Forecast Office. 
Freeze watch (NPW) – Issued during the locally defined growing season when conditions are favorable for a freeze event that may damage or kill crops to meet or exceed Freeze Warning criteria within 24 to 48 hours.
Frost advisory (NPW) – Issued during the locally defined growing season when minimum sheltered temperatures are forecast to be near or slightly above freezing over an extensive area on nights with good radiational cooling conditions (e.g., light winds and clear skies). Widespread frost can be expected. Frost Advisories are usually issued to highlight frost events occurring during the locally defined starting and ending periods of the growing season, and will be intermediately issued when appropriate until the end of the growing season based on criteria set by the Weather Forecast Office.
Hard freeze warning (NPW) – Minimum shelter temperatures are forecast to be  or below over a widespread area during the growing season. A hard freeze may occur with or without frost. Temperature criteria may vary slightly in some county warning areas.
Hard freeze watch (NPW) – Conditions are favorable for widespread sub-freezing temperatures that would meet or exceed Hard Freeze Warning criteria within the next 12 to 48 hours during the locally defined growing season.
Heat advisory (NPW) – High Heat Index (HI) values are forecast to meet or exceed locally defined warning criteria for one or two days. Specific criteria vary over different county warning areas, due to climate variability and the effect of excessive heat on the local population. Warning criteria may be lowered by the issuing WFO if the heat event occurs early in the season, during a multi-day heat wave or during a widespread power outage occurring during a heat event due to severe weather phenomena (such as high winds, severe thunderstorms, or a derecho).

Windchill
Wind chill warning (NPW) – Extreme wind chills, capable of causing life-threatening medical conditions (such as severe frostbite and hypothermia) or death associated with accelerated heat loss from exposed skin, are imminent or occurring. The apparent temperature and wind speed criteria vary significantly over different county warning areas based on climate variability. This product will be deprecated sometime in 2021, and be superseded by the Extreme Cold Warning product, which will include dual criteria for extreme wind chill and actual temperature values, and have its use expanded to WFOs elsewhere in the conterminious United States.
Wind chill advisory (NPW) – Dangerous wind chills making it feel very cold are imminent or occurring. The apparent temperature and wind speed criteria vary significantly over different county warning areas based on climate variability.
Wind chill watch (NPW) – Extreme wind chills that are capable of causing life-threatening medical conditions associated with accelerated heat loss from exposed skin are possible within the next 12 to 48 hours; the apparent temperature and wind speed criteria vary significantly over different county warning areas.

Aviation
The following advisories are issued by the National Weather Service Aviation Weather Center (outside of Alaska) or Alaska Aviation Weather Unit. Atmospheric ash plume advisories/warnings are also issued by the United States Geological Survey (Aviation Color Codes).
Airport weather warning (AWW) – Addresses weather phenomena (including but not limited to surface wind gusts around or above , freezing rain, heavy snow or thunderstorms producing cloud-to-ground lightning within  of the airport and/or  hail) capable of adversely affecting ground operations at regional and international airports. AWWs are intended for the use of airport managers, fixed-based operators, airline ground personnel, and other personnel responsible for the safety of ground operations.
Center weather advisory (CWA) – Advisories issued when conditions just below severe (SIGMET) criteria. CWAs are issued for thunderstorms, turbulence, icing, and ceiling and visibility limits (IFR). 
SIGMET (significant meteorological information; SIG) – Advises of weather that is potentially hazardous to all aircraft and is affecting or is forecast to affect at least .
Convective SIGMET (SIG) – Implies severe or greater turbulence, severe icing, and low level wind shear.
SIGMET advisories are issued for six hours during hurricanes and four hours for other weather-related events. 
Volcanic ash advisories (VAA) – Advisory issued for all ash plumes detected by satellite imagery, including the location of the volcano, location/description of ash plume, forecast (at 6, 12 and 18 hours), and a graphic of the ash plume location/forecast. VAAs are issued by Volcanic Ash Advisory Centers in Anchorage (Alaska) and Washington (Contiguous United States, Caribbean, Central America, most of the North Pacific, and South America north of 10°S).

VAAs are standardized worldwide by the International Civil Aviation Organization.

Tropical weather

Tropical storm warning (TRW) – Tropical storm conditions (gale- and storm-force sustained winds of ) are expected within the specified coastal or inland area within 36 hours (24 hours for Guam, as locally defined by the Barrigada-based WFO) in advance of the forecast onset of tropical-storm-force winds. These winds may be accompanied by storm surge, and coastal and/or river flooding. Tropical Storm Warnings may also be issued in association with a subtropical or post-tropical cyclone.
Tropical storm watch (TRA) – Tropical storm conditions (gale- and storm-force sustained winds of ) are possible within the specified coastal or inland area within 48 hours in advance of the forecast onset of tropical-storm-force winds. These winds may be accompanied by storm surge, and coastal and/or river flooding. Tropical Storm Watches may also be issued in association with a subtropical or post-tropical cyclone.
A Hurricane Warning can remain in effect if dangerously high storm surge, or a combination of dangerous storm surge and waves continue, even when winds fall below hurricane criteria. (This product is issued as a Typhoon Warning by the NWS Forecast Office in Barrigada, Guam, which uses a 24-hour maximum lead time before the onset of tropical-storm-force winds.)
(This product is issued as a Typhoon Watch by the NWS Forecast Office in Barrigada, Guam and its partnering tropical weather forecasting agency, the Central Pacific Hurricane Center.)
Hurricane local statement (HLS) – Issued by NWS Weather Forecast Offices for hurricane-threatened zones within the office's Warning Area, providing detailed weather conditions, evacuation decisions made by local law enforcement and emergency management agencies, and other necessary safety precautions for residents in the cyclone's path.
Extreme Wind Warnings—which should be issued no prior than two hours before the onset of extreme winds—are not issued by WFOs located within the Pacific basin.

Other hazards
Air quality alert (AQA) – Significant atmospheric pollution (through inhalable particulates or ozone) is expected to accumulate in a given area, and may be hazardous to people suffering from respiratory conditions. Criteria developed in conjunction with the local or state EPA and the product issued at their request.
Air stagnation advisory (NPW) – Atmospheric conditions stable enough to cause air pollutants to accumulate in a given area. Criteria are developed in conjunction with the local or state EPA and the product is issued at their request.
Ashfall from the large airborne ash plume may originate directly from a volcanic eruption, from the re-suspension (by wind) of a significant amount of relic ash, or by large fires. Ashfall accumulations may affect the health of people suffering from respiratory illnesses.
Civil emergency message (CEM) – A message intended to warn the public of an in-progress or imminent significant threat(s) to public safety and/or property. Although the hazard that warrants such a message to be issued is less specific than that meriting a Civil Danger Warning, it is given higher priority than the Local Area Emergency.
Freezing fog advisory (NPW) – Widespread dense fog reducing visibility to less than  that occurs in a sub-freezing environment, producing very light glazed ice accumulations on exposed surfaces.
The wind speeds must not be directly associated with a tropical cyclone.
Wind speeds may pose a hazard to pedestrian and vehicular travel (including toppling or creating flying debris from unsecured outdoor objects, and the risk of pushing cars outside their lane of travel and overturning high-profile vehicles), and cause disruption of electrical utilities and wired telecommunications services (including the downing of electrical lines). Warning criteria may vary by county warning area based on local climatological strong wind frequency. A tropical storm warning implies a high wind warning.
Wind speeds may pose a hazard to pedestrian and vehicular travel (including toppling or creating flying debris from unsecured outdoor objects, and the risk of pushing cars outside their lane of travel and overturning high-profile vehicles), and cause disruption of electrical utilities and wired telecommunications services (including the downing of electrical lines). Watch criteria may vary depending on the county warning area based on local climatological strong wind frequency.
Hurricane-like wind damage is expected, and severe structural damage is likely. Those in an extreme wind warning are asked to take cover immediately as if they were in a hurricane or tornado warning. A hurricane warning implies an extreme wind warning.
The wind speeds must not be directly associated with a tropical cyclone.
The expected occurrence, location and/or timing of the wind event may be uncertain but is forecast to take place within the next few days. The wind speeds must not be directly associated with a tropical cyclone. 
Low water advisory (MWS) – Water levels are significantly below average levels over major lakes, coastal marine zones, and tidal marine areas, waterway, or river inlet within or adjacent to a marine zone, which could create a hazard to navigation. Issued primarily for areas within the Northern Region Headquarters near the Great Lakes region.
Special weather statement (SPS) – An advisory issued when a hazard is approaching advisory criteria. In most cases, special weather statements typically highlight upcoming significant weather events (such as substantial temperature changes, dense fog and winter weather events). Short-fused convective statements (which superseded the significant weather advisory product used by most NWS offices in July 2021) are issued for non-severe thunderstorms near or below warning criteria.
Particularly dangerous situation special weather statement (SPS) – An enhanced advisory issued for hazards that do not have a specific code of their own, and pose an exceptionally high risk of damage and loss of life.
Expected wind speeds are likely to cause significant navigational impairment and/or damage to commercial and recreational boating within the warned area. The wind speeds must not be directly associated with a tropical cyclone.
Expected wind speeds may cause significant navigational impairment and/or damage to commercial and recreational boating. The wind speeds must not be directly associated with a tropical cyclone.
Wind speeds may pose a hazard to pedestrian and vehicular travel, topple and/or create flying debris from unsecured outdoor objects, and potentially disrupt public utilities and down electrical lines. Advisory criteria may vary by county warning area depending on local climatology; winds of the standard criteria magnitude occurring over an area that frequently experiences such wind speeds will not necessarily trigger a wind advisory.

Non-meteorological hazards and administrative messages
The National Weather Service also relays messages for non-weather related hazardous events in text products and NOAA Weather Radio broadcasts:
911 telephone outage emergency (TOE) – Issued when 911 telephone service experiences a network outage over a geographic area or telephone exchange. Alternative phone numbers in which to reach 911 or dispatch emergency personnel will be provided to the public.
Administrative message (ADR) – A non-emergency message providing updated information about an event that is either in progress, has expired or concluded early, pre-event preparation or mitigation activities, post-event recovery operations, or other Emergency Alert System-related administrative matters.
Avalanche watch (AVA) – Indicates conditions are forecast to favor natural or human-induced avalanches that could affect roadways, structures, or backcountry activities.
Avalanche warning (AVW) – Avalanche activity—either natural or human-induced—is ongoing or imminent, and likely to affect roadways, structures or backcountry activities and threaten the lives of people within the avalanche's path. Safety precautions will be recommended or ordered as dictated by state law or local ordinance.
Blue alert (BLU) – Issued by state and local authorities to warn the public of information relating to a law enforcement officer who is missing, seriously injured or was killed in the line of duty, or if there is an imminent, credible threat to an officer. Information on the suspect and safety instructions for if the suspect has been spotted within a specific community may be included. The NWS added the ability to convey these messages to its WFOs on a phased basis beginning in late 2019.
Child abduction emergency (CAE) – An emergency message, usually issued in accordance with an Amber alert, informing the public and law enforcement about a missing child believed to have been abducted. Local or state law enforcement agencies investigating the abduction will provide descriptions of the missing child, suspect or vehicle used by the suspect, and ask the public to notify the requesting agency if they have information on the child's or suspect's whereabouts.
Civil danger warning (CDW) – Assigned a higher priority than a Local Area Emergency, this indicates a hazardous event (such as the contamination of local water supply or a military or terrorist attack that is imminent or ongoing) presenting a danger to a significant civilian population, requiring specific protective action (such as evacuation or sheltering in place).
Earthquake warning (EQW) – Indicates earthquake activity is ongoing or imminent.
Evacuation immediate (EVI) – Warns the public that immediate evacuation for a long-duration emergency event (such as for an approaching tropical cyclone, a wildfire or the release of flammable or explosive gas) has been recommended or ordered by state and/or local law enforcement.
Hazardous materials warning (HMW) – Warns the public of the release of non-radioactive hazardous material (such as a flammable gas, toxic chemical, or biological agent) that may necessitate recommendations of evacuation (for an explosion, fire or oil spill hazard) or sheltering in place (for a toxic fume hazard).
Law enforcement warning (LEW) – Issued by authorized law enforcement agencies to warn the public of a bomb explosion, riot, or other criminal event (e.g., a jailbreak) that may result in the blockade roads, waterways, or facilities, the evacuation or denial of access to affected areas, and the arrest of violators or suspicious persons.
Local area emergency (LAE) – An emergency message that defines an event of insignificant threat to public safety and/or property, which could escalate, contribute to more serious events, or disrupt critical public safety services (such as a disruption in water, electric or natural gas service, snowfall-induced road closures, or a potential terrorism threat).
Nuclear power plant warning (NUW) – Warns of a hazardous materials event at a nuclear power plant classified as a Site Area Emergency (a hazardous event confined to the plant site) or General Emergency (an event affecting a less than  radius around the plant) under Nuclear Regulatory Commission (NRC) guidelines. Authorized officials may recommend evacuation or medical treatment of exposed persons in nearby areas.
Radiological hazard warning (RHW) – Indicates the loss, discovery, theft or release of a radiological hazard.
Shelter in place warning (SPW) – Indicates an event (such as the release of hazardous materials containing toxic fumes or radioactivity harmful to residents in the warning area) in which the public is recommended to shelter in place and take necessary safety precautions.
Tsunami watch (TSA) – A tsunami is forecast to impact the specified area.
Tsunami warning (TSW) – A tsunami with the potential of causing widespread coastal flooding accompanied by powerful currents and inundation and/or significant damage to adjacent property is imminent, expected or occurring and may continue for several hours after the wave's initial arrival, issued by the National Tsunami Warning Center.
Tsunami advisory – A tsunami with the potential to generate strong currents or waves dangerous to those in or very near the water is imminent, expected, or occurring. The threat may continue for several hours after initial arrival, but significant inundation of land and adjacent property is not expected.
Volcano warning (VOW) – Indicates volcanic activity that is ongoing or imminent.

Wind and tropical cyclones
Wind alerting is classified into groups of two Beaufort numbers, beginning at 6–7 for the lowest class of wind advisories. The last group includes three Beaufort numbers, 14–16. The actual alerts can be categorized into three classes: maritime wind warnings, land wind warnings, and tropical cyclone warnings. Advisory-force and gale-force winds will not trigger a separate wind advisory or warning if a Blizzard warning is already in effect. However, as seen with Hurricane Sandy, if widespread high wind warnings are in effect prior to the issuance of a blizzard warning, the high wind warnings may be continued.

Wind alert terms and signals

* 
† 
‡

Hazardous weather risks
The various weather conditions described above have different levels of risk. The National Weather Service uses a multi-tier system of weather statements to notify the public of threatening weather conditions. These statements are used in conjunction with specific weather phenomena to convey different levels of risk. In order of increasing risk, these statements are:
Outlook – A Hazardous Weather Outlook is issued daily to indicate that a hazardous weather or hydrologic event may occur in the next seven days. Each segment of the product will contain sections outlining hazardous weather in the short term (through Day 1) and long term (for Days 2-7), and spotter information. The outlook will include information about potential severe thunderstorms, heavy rain or flooding, winter weather, extremes of heat or cold, etc., that may develop over the next seven days with an emphasis on the first 24 hours of the forecast. It is intended to provide information to those who need considerable lead time to prepare for the event (such as emergency management agencies, Skywarn spotters and media outlets). If issued for a coastal area, the outlook will contain two segments: one for the marine zones and adjacent land-based (i.e., coastal) zones, and the other for the remainder of the land-based zones.
Advisory – An advisory is issued when a hazardous weather or hydrologic event is occurring, imminent, or likely. Advisories are for "less serious" conditions than warnings that may cause significant inconvenience, and if caution is not exercised could lead to situations that may threaten life or property. The National Weather Service may activate weather spotters in areas affected by advisories to help them better track and analyze the event.
Emergency – An Emergency is issued when an event that by itself cannot pose a threat to life or property, but may indirectly cause other events to happen that may pose a threat to life or property. An example of this would be a power outage, which although not directly posing a hazard, may threaten public safety and critical services. The only existing exceptions to this are the tornado emergency and flash flood emergency, which are issued to get the attention of the public to a major tornado or flash flood.
Watch – A watch is used when the risk of a hazardous weather or hydrologic event has increased significantly, but its occurrence, location, or timing is still uncertain. It is intended to provide enough lead time so those who need to set their plans in motion can do so. A watch means that hazardous weather is possible. People should have a plan of action in case a storm threatens and they should listen for later information and possible warnings especially when planning travel or outdoor activities. The National Weather Service may activate weather spotters in areas affected by watches to help them better track and analyze the event.
Warning – A warning is issued when a hazardous weather or hydrologic event is occurring, imminent, or likely. A warning means weather conditions pose a threat to life or property. People in the path of the storm need to take protective action. The National Weather Service may activate weather spotters in areas affected by warnings to help them better track and analyze the event.
Statement – A statement is either issued as a follow-up message to a warning, watch, or emergency, that may update, extend, or cancel the message it is following up or a notification of significant weather for which no type of advisory, watch, or warning exists.

Convective outlook categories

The Storm Prediction Center (SPC) issues Day 1, Day 2, and Day 3 Convective Outlooks depicting forecast areas of general (non-severe) and severe thunderstorm threats across the contiguous United States, along with a text narrative discussion consisting of a plain-language summary of the threat type(s) and timing focused on areas of highest risk, and a technical discussion written in scientific language that usually includes a synoptic overview of convective patterns as well as, if necessary, a geographically specific narrative of meteorological reasoning and justification for the type of coverage and intensity applicable to the severe thunderstorm threat.

The categorical forecast in the Day 1-3 Convective Outlooks—which estimates a severe weather event occurring within  of a point and derives the attendant risk areas from probability forecasts of tornadoes, damaging winds, and large hail on Days 1 and 2, and a combined severe weather risk on Day 3—specifies the level of overall severe thunderstorm risk via numbers, descriptive labeling, and colors as follows: (The Day 4-8 Convective Outlook assesses the percentile probability of severe thunderstorm activity during that period at the 15% and 30% likelihood.)

Warning impact statements
Many of the National Weather Service's Weather Forecast Offices—primarily those located within the Central and Southern Region Headquarters—use a multi-tier impact-based warning (IBW) system of impact statements to notify the public and emergency management officials of the severity of specific severe weather phenomena. The impact statement system—initially used only for tornado and severe thunderstorm warnings—was first employed by the WFOs in Wichita and Topeka, Kansas, and Springfield, St. Louis and Kansas City/Pleasant Hill, Missouri beginning with the 2012 Spring severe weather season, eventually expanded to include 33 additional National Weather Service Weather Forecast Offices within the Central Region Headquarters in 2013, and then to eight additional offices within the Eastern, Southern and Western Regions in the spring of 2014. Since July 28, 2021 (or as late as August 2 in certain County Warning Areas), the NWS has incorporated categorical “CONSIDERABLE” and “DESTRUCTIVE" damage threat indicators (similar to those incorporated into tornado warning products since the implementation of the Impact Based Warning system) at the bottom of the product text of certain severe thunderstorm warnings and related Severe Weather Statements to indicate higher-end hail and/or wind events caused by the parent storm cell.

Under this system, the warning product will include text denoting the specific hazard (i.e., 60 mph wind gusts and quarter size hail) and applicable sourcing (either via indication from Doppler weather radar, or visual confirmation from storm spotters or other emergency management officials) and the level of impact to life and/or property. In order of increasing risk by warning type, these statements—which may be modified at the discretion of the regional forecast office—are:

Media distribution
Hazardous weather forecasts and alerts are provided to the public using the NOAA Weather Radio All Hazards system and through news media such as television, radio and internet sources. Many local television stations have overlay graphics which will either show a map or a list of the affected areas. The most common NWS weather alerts to be broadcast over NOAA Weather Radio using SAME technology are described in the following table:

Related weather scales as defined by the NWS
The NWS uses several scales in describing weather events or conditions. Several common scales are described below.

Hail diameter sizes

The size of individual hailstones that reach surface level is determined by speed of the updraft which create the individual ice crystals at atmospheric levels. Larger hailstones are capable of producing damage to property, and particularly with very large hailstones, resulting in serious injury or death due to blunt-force trauma induced by the impact of the hailstones. Hailstone size is typically correspondent to the size of an object for comparative purposes.

* Begins hail sizes within the severe hail criterion.
† Begins hail sizes within the Storm Prediction Center's significant severe criterion.

Beaufort wind scale

The Beaufort scale is an empirical measure that correlates wind speed to observed conditions at sea or on land.

†:Beaufort levels above 12 are non-standard in the United States. Instead, the Saffir–Simpson hurricane scale (Category 1, Category 2, etc.) is used.

Enhanced Fujita tornado intensity scale

The Enhanced Fujita scale, an updated version of the original Fujita scale that was developed by Ted Fujita with Allen Pearson, assigns a numerical rating from EF0 to EF5 to rate the damage intensity of tornadoes. EF0 and EF1 tornadoes are considered "weak" tornadoes, EF2 and EF3 are classified as "strong" tornadoes, with winds of at least major hurricane force, where EF4 and EF5 are categorized as "violent" tornadoes, with winds corresponding to category 5 hurricane winds and rising to match or exceed the strongest tropical cyclones on record. The EF scale is based on tornado damage (primarily to buildings), which makes it difficult to rate tornadoes that strike in sparsely populated areas, where few man-made structures are found. The Enhanced Fujita scale went into effect on February 1, 2007.

Saffir–Simpson hurricane category scale

The Saffir–Simpson hurricane wind scale, assigns a numerical classification of hurricanes into five categories distinguished by the intensities of their sustained winds. The scale spans from Category 1 (winds of at least ) to Category 5 (exceeding ). Unlike the Enhanced Fujita Scale, which assigns ratings for tornadoes after damage has been incurred and thoroughly assessed, categories on the Saffir-Simpson scale are assigned to most active cyclones that reach the minimum hurricane threshold, even before landfall.

{| class="wikitable" style="text-align: right;"
|-
! Category !! Sustained winds !! Storm surge !! Central pressure !! Potential damage !! style="width: 9em;"|Example(s)
|-
! style="background: #;" | 
| 33–42 m/s
74–95 mph
64–82 knot
119–153 km/h
| 4–5 ft
1.2–1.5 m
| 28.94 inHg
980 mbar
| style="text-align: left;" | No real damage to building structures. Damage primarily to unanchored mobile homes, shrubbery, and trees. Also, some coastal flooding and minor pier damage.
| Jerry (1989)
Ismael (1995)
Danny (1997)
Gaston (2004)
Kate (2015)
|-
! style="background: #;" | 
| 43–49 m/s
96–110 mph
83–95 kn
154–177 km/h
| 6–8 ft
1.8–2.4 m
| 28.50–28.91 inHg
965–979 mbar
| style="text-align: left;" | Some roofing material, door, and window damage. Considerable damage to vegetation, mobile homes, etc. Flooding damages piers and small craft in unprotected anchorages may break their moorings.
| Carol (1954)
Diana (1990)
Erin (1995)
Marty (2003)
Juan (2003)
|-
! style="background: #;" | 
| 50–58 m/s
111–129 mph
96–113 kn
178–209 km/h
| 9–12 ft
2.7–3.7 m
| 27.91–28.47 inHg
945–964 mbar
| style="text-align: left;" | Some structural damage to small residences and utility buildings, with a minor amount of curtainwall failures. Mobile homes are destroyed. Flooding near the coast destroys smaller structures with larger structures damaged by floating debris. Terrain may be flooded well inland.
| Alma (1966)
Alicia (1983)
Roxanne (1995)
Fran (1996)
Isidore (2002)
Sandy (2012)
|-
! style="background: #;" | 
| 59–69 m/s
130–156 mph
114–135 kn
210–249 km/h
| 13–18 ft
4.0–5.5 m
| 27.17–27.88 inHg
920–944 mbar
| style="text-align: left;" | More extensive curtainwall failures with some complete roof structure failure on small residences. Major erosion of beach areas. Terrain may be flooded well inland. 
| "Galveston" (1900)
Hazel (1954)
Iniki (1992)
Iris (2001)
Harvey (2017) 
Laura (2020)
Ian (2022)
|-
! style="background: #;" | 
| 70 m/s157 mph136 kn250 km/h
| 19 ft5.5 m
| <27.17 inHg
<920 mbar
| style="text-align: left;" | Complete roof failure on many residences and industrial buildings. Some complete building failures with small utility buildings blown over or away. Flooding causes major damage to lower floors of all structures near the shoreline. Massive evacuation of residential areas may be required.
| "Labor Day" (1935)
Camille (1969)
Gilbert (1988)
Andrew (1992)
Wilma (2005)
Irma (2017)
Michael (2018)
Dorian (2019)
|}

See also
 Emergency Alert System
 Glossary of climate change
 Glossary of environmental science
 Glossary of meteorology
 List of climate change topics
 List of severe weather phenomena
 Local storm report
 National Weather Service
 National Weather Service bulletin for New Orleans region, generally considered the most seriously worded NWS forecast ever issued, done so the day before Hurricane Katrina.
 NOAA Weather Radio
 Severe weather terminology (Canada)
 Severe weather terminology (Japan)
 Specific Area Message Encoding

References

External links
 NWS Directives System
 National Weather Service glossary of terms
 NWS Southern Region glossary of tropical storm terms
 National Weather Service, Louisville, Kentucky
 National Weather Service, Chicago, Illinois
 NWS National Hurricane Center
 NWS EF-scale training

Severe weather and convection
Weather warnings and advisories